is a Japanese ice hockey player and member of the Japanese national team, currently playing with the Seibu Princess Rabbits of the Women's Japan Ice Hockey League (WJIHL) and All-Japan Women's Ice Hockey Championship. 

Kubo made her international debut with the Japanese national ice hockey team in the women's ice hockey tournament at the 1999 Asian Winter Games. With more than two decades on the national team, she is the longest tenured player in team history and has represented Japan at the 2014, 2018, and 2022 Winter Olympics, at thirteen IIHF Women's World Championships, and at four Asian Winter Games. She participated in the World Championship Top Division tournaments in 2000, 2004, 2015, 2016, 2019, and 2021; the Division I Group A tournaments in 2012, 2013, and 2017; the Division I tournaments in 2001, 2003, and 2005; and the Pool B tournament in 1999.

References

External links
 
 

1982 births
Living people
Sportspeople from Hokkaido
Japanese women's ice hockey forwards
Olympic ice hockey players of Japan
Ice hockey players at the 2014 Winter Olympics
Ice hockey players at the 2018 Winter Olympics
Ice hockey players at the 2022 Winter Olympics
Asian Games medalists in ice hockey
Ice hockey players at the 1999 Asian Winter Games
Ice hockey players at the 2003 Asian Winter Games
Ice hockey players at the 2007 Asian Winter Games
Ice hockey players at the 2017 Asian Winter Games
Medalists at the 1999 Asian Winter Games
Medalists at the 2003 Asian Winter Games
Medalists at the 2007 Asian Winter Games
Medalists at the 2017 Asian Winter Games
Asian Games gold medalists for Japan
Asian Games silver medalists for Japan